Ghassan Muhsen (Arabic:  غسان محسن  ; born 1945) is an Iraqi career diplomat, as well as an artist with over 18 solo exhibitions and over 30 joint shows in four continents ranging from New Delhi to New York, from Dubai to Tunis. Currently Ambassador Ghassan Muhsen serves as Ambassador to the Kingdom of Bahrain. His work usually incorporates three basic elements "Floral, architectural motifs, and traditional calligraphy" His paintings are "a result of a fusion between the three" His work has been exhibited extensively throughout Europe and the Middle East.

Personal 
Ghassan was born in Nassiriyah, Iraq, to army officer. Ghassan was born into an Iraqi family of Arab heritage.

Family 
Married to Maha Al Baroudi, Ambassador Ghassan Muhsen had three sons, Mustafa, Ziyad, Al Ahareth and Al Monther

Art career 
Growing up in Iraq, Ghassan Muhsin, was taught by some of the most well known pioneers of art, Shakir Hassan Al-Sai’d, Ismail Fateh Al Turk & Dr. Ismail Al Sheikhly during his high school years, but apart from that has no formal training in the arts,

Early era 1970s to 1981 

While posted in New York in the 1970s Ghassan's artistic spirit surfaced. New York's vibrant cultural scene, art world, museums, people and architecture influenced Ghassan to the point where he took up oil paints and canvas and started painting in a formal fashion. His creativity was heavily influenced by his surroundings.

Floral phase 1982 to 1991 
Posted to Pakistan, Ghassan was influenced by the art of the subcontinent and the environment he was living in, his works started to incorporate more and more floral motifs

Fusion Phase 1992 to 2003

Selected solo exhibitions
2011 "A Fresh Start: New Works by Ghassan Muhsen" Pomegranate Gallery, New York, NY
2010 Westwood Gallery, New Jersey, NJ
2010 Pomegranate Gallery, New York, NY
2008 Assilah Cultural Festival, Assilah Morocco
2007 Sultan Bin Ali Owais Cultural Foundation, Dubai UAE
2007 The Lahore Arts Council, Lahore Pakistan
2007 Bahrain Interior Design Exhibition, Exhibition Center Bahrain
2006 Alfonoon Gallery, Kuwait
2005 Cultural Foundation, Abu Dhabi UAE
2005 Bahrain Art Center, Bahrain
2002 Indian Council For Cultural Relations, New Delhi India
2002 Baghdad Gallery, Baghdad, Iraq
2001 Baghdad Gallery, Baghdad, Iraq
2000 Baghdad Gallery, Baghdad, Iraq
1997 Baghdad Gallery, Baghdad, Iraq
1996 Abaad Gallery, Baghdad, Iraq
1989 Baghdad Gallery, Baghdad, Iraq
1986 Rothas Gallery, Rawalpindi, Pakistan
1985 French Cultural Centre, Islamabad, Pakistan
1982 Rothas Gallery, Rawalpindi, Pakistan

Joint shows 
2009 Dar El Jild, Tunis, Tunisia
2009 Seedi Bu Said, Tunisia
2007 Al Bareh Gallery, Bahrain
2006 Pomegranate Gallery New York, NY
2004 Bahrain Art Centre, Bahrain
2004 Assilah Cultural Festival, Assilah, Morocco
2001 National Art Gallery, Beijing, China
2001 Baghdad 3rd Art Festival, Baghdad, Iraq
2001 Al Orfali Art Gallery, Baghdad, Iraq
2000 Al Orfali Art Gallery, Baghdad, Iraq
2000 Baghdad Art Gallery, Baghdad, Iraq
1985 National Art Gallery, Islamabad, Pakistan

See also
 Iraqi art
 Islamic art
 List of Iraqi artists

References

External links 

 Ghassan Muhsin Official Website
 IraqiArtist.com Article

Iraqi painters
Ambassadors of Iraq to Bahrain
1945 births
Living people
Iraqi expatriates in Pakistan